The 1952 Georgia Tech Yellow Jackets football team represented the Georgia Institute of Technology in the 1952 NCAA football season. Led by head coach Bobby Dodd, the Yellow Jackets went undefeated including a victory in the 1953 Sugar Bowl. Coach Bobby Dodd and the Yellow Jackets were awarded a split National Championship, winning the 1952 INS National Championship poll, sharing the Championship with the Michigan State Spartans. The team was selected national champion by Berryman, Billingsley, INS, Poling, and Sagarin (ELO-Chess).

Schedule

Team players drafted into the NFL

References

Georgia Tech
Georgia Tech Yellow Jackets football seasons
College football national champions
Southeastern Conference football champion seasons
Sugar Bowl champion seasons
College football undefeated seasons
Georgia Tech Yellow Jackets football